George Latham (died 1871) was an English architect and surveyor, who practised from on office in Nantwich, Cheshire.  His works include churches, country houses, a workhouse, a bank, and a market hall.  Hartwell et al. in the Buildings of England series consider that his finest work was Arley Hall.  He designed buildings in a variety of architectural styles, including Neoclassical, Jacobean, and Georgian.

Major works

Key

Works

References
Citations

Sources

 

Lists of buildings and structures by architect